This is a comprehensive discography of the group Puressence.

Albums

EP's

Singles

Puressence Singles

Only Forever Singles

Planet Helpless Singles

Don't Forget To Remember Singles

Discographies of British artists
Rock music group discographies